KXGM may refer to:

KXGM (AM), an off-the-air radio station (850 AM) licensed to Waterloo, Iowa
KXGM (FM), a radio station (89.1 FM) licensed to Hiawatha, Iowa